Red Party may refer to
Red Party (Canada)
Red Party (Dominican Republic) 
Red Party (Norway)
Red Party (Paraguay) (Partido Colorado)
Red Party (Taiwan)
Red Party (UK)
Red Party (Uruguay) (Partido Colorado)